Socognathus is a genus of prehistoric chamopsiid polyglyphanodontian lizards containing species that lived from the Middle Campanian stage to the late Maastrichtian. Several specimens of the type species, Socognathus unicuspis, have been found in Alberta, Canada. A second species, Socognathus brachyodon is known from the late Maastrichtian Lance Formation; its fossils have been found in Wyoming, United States.

References

Teiidae
Late Cretaceous lepidosaurs of North America
Cretaceous lizards
Fossil taxa described in 1991